Ženski košarkaški klub Student is a women's professional basketball club based in Niš, Serbia. They are currently competing in the Women's Serbian League.

Honours
Milan Ciga Vasojević Cup:
Winners (1) : 1993
Runners-up (1) : 1994

See also 
 List of basketball clubs in Serbia by major honours won

External links
 Profile on eurobasket.com
 Profile on srbijasport.net

Student Nis
Sport in Niš
Women's basketball teams in Yugoslavia
Basketball teams established in 1957